Bonstetten is a village in the district of Affoltern in the canton of Zürich in Switzerland.

History

Bonstetten is first mentioned in 1120 as Buonstetin, though this reference is debated. In 1184 it was mentioned as Bowensteden.

Geography
Of this area, 57.3% is used for agricultural purposes, while 29.2% is forested. Of the rest of the land, 13.3% is settled (buildings or roads) and the remainder (0.1%) is non-productive (rivers, glaciers or mountains).

Demographics
, 11.5% of the population was made up of foreign nationals. Over the last 10 years the population has grown at a rate of 32.6%. Most of the population speaks German (90.6%), with English being second most common ( 2.2%) and Italian being third ( 1.9%). In the 2007 election the most popular party was the SVP which received 30.6% of the vote. The next three most popular parties were the SPS (20.4%), the FDP (17.2%) and the CSP (12.4%).

The age distribution of the population is children and teenagers (0–19 years old) make up 24.5% of the population, while adults (20–64 years old) make up 67.2% and seniors (over 64 years old) make up 8.2%. In Bonstetten about 86.5% of the population (between age 25-64) have completed either non-mandatory upper secondary education or additional higher education (either university or a Fachhochschule).

Bonstetten has an unemployment rate of 1.62%. , there were 101 people employed in the primary economic sector and about 25 businesses involved in this sector. 95 people are employed in the secondary sector and there are 26 businesses in this sector. 543 people are employed in the tertiary sector, with 112 businesses in this sector.
The historical population is given in the following table:

Transport
Bonstetten-Wettswil railway station is a stop of the Zürich S-Bahn on the lines S9 and S15. It is a 23-minute ride from Zürich Hauptbahnhof.

References

External links

 Official website 
 

Municipalities of the canton of Zürich